Dendrogastrida is an order of crustaceans belonging to the class Maxillopoda.

Families:
 Ascothoracidae
 Ctenosculidae
 Dendrogastridae

References

Maxillopoda
Crustacean families